Phil is an unincorporated community in western Casey County, Kentucky, United States. Their post office  is no longer in service. It was named by F. P. Combest, the community's first postmaster, for his favorite politician, U.S. Representative Phil Thompson.

References

Unincorporated communities in Casey County, Kentucky
Unincorporated communities in Kentucky